Sodd is a traditional Norwegian soup  made with cooked  mutton and meatballs  made with  lamb or beef. Potatoes and  carrots  are included in a clear, fragrant broth. In what is considered the proper way of serving, both the potatoes and carrots should be boiled separately and then only included upon serving. This is done by the table, where people plate their own servings.

Background
The meatballs are commonly flavored with ginger and nutmeg. 
It is traditional food most associated with the region of Trøndelag where it is customarily served on festive occasions, such as weddings and confirmation ceremonies.

See also
lobscouse

References

Norwegian cuisine
Soups
Meatballs
Meat and potatoes dishes